Zygmunt Jakub Gadecki (21 January 1938 – 21 November 2000) was a Polish footballer who competed in the 1960 Summer Olympics.

References

1938 births
2000 deaths
Association football forwards
Poland international footballers
Polish footballers
Olympic footballers of Poland
Footballers at the 1960 Summer Olympics
Lechia Gdańsk players
Sportspeople from Gdynia
Western Eagles FC players